Sheila Strike (born 2 November 1954) is a Canadian basketball player. She competed in the women's tournament at the 1976 Summer Olympics.

References

1954 births
Living people
Basketball people from British Columbia
Canadian women's basketball players
Olympic basketball players of Canada
Basketball players at the 1976 Summer Olympics
Basketball players from Vancouver